Wien Breitensee is a railway station serving Penzing, the fourteenth district of Vienna.

References 

Breitensee
Austrian Federal Railways